The 1958–59 season was the 13th season in FK Partizan's existence. This article shows player statistics and matches that the club played during the 1958–59 season.

Players

First 11 
Šoškić, Kranjčić, Jusufi, Belin, Jončić, Miladinović, Z. Čebinac, Kaloperović, Vukelić, Galić, B. Mihajlović.

Other players who played during the season 
Stojanović, Pajević, S. Čebinac, Blažić, Vasović, Mitić, Kovačević, Radović, Sombolac, Vislavski, Pajković, Srbu.

Friendlies

Competitions

Yugoslav First League

Yugoslav Cup

Mitropa Cup

Quarter-finals

Semi-finals

See also
 List of FK Partizan seasons

References

External links
 Official website
 Partizanopedia 1958-59  (in Serbian)

FK Partizan seasons
Partizan